Albota de Jos is a commune in Taraclia District, Moldova. It is composed of three villages: Albota de Jos, Hagichioi and Hîrtop.

During the interwar period, the commune was the seat of Plasa Mihai Viteazul, in Cahul County, Romania.

References

Communes of Taraclia District
Cahul County (Romania)